There have been two ships of the Royal Navy named HMS Rosalind, named after the protagonist in William Shakespeare's As You Like It:

 , renamed  shortly after launching in 1913, an  destroyer that fought at the Battle of Jutland in 1916 and was broken up in 1921.
 , an  launched by Thornycroft in 1916 and scrapped in 1926.

See also
 The Modified Rosalinds were five s built by Thornycroft based on the 1916 ship.
 HMT Rosalind was a  naval trawler launched in 1941 and transferred to Kenya 1946.

References

Royal Navy ship names